Sketches of MD: Live at The Iridium is one of the few live albums by Kenny Garrett, his first for Mack Avenue Records, released in 2008. The Mack Avenue label was based out of Garrett’s hometown of Detroit. Garrett is featured in a quintet with tenor saxophonist Pharoah Sanders, keyboardist Benito Gonzalez, bassist Nat Reeves and drummer Jamire Williams.
The "MD" of the title track refers to Garrett’s old bandleader Miles Davis.

Track listing

Personnel 
Musicians
Kenny Garrett – alto saxophone, bass clarinet, organ, synthesizer
Pharoah Sanders – tenor saxophone, vocals
Nat Reeves – bass
Benito Gonzalez – piano, electric piano (Fender Rhodes), synthesizer
Jamire Williams – drums

Production
Kenny Garrett –  producer
Gretchen Valade – executive producer, liner notes
Al Pryor – executive VP of A&R
Jonathan Duckett – engineer (recording)
Greg Calbi – engineer (mastering)
Raj Naik – art direction, design
Casey Conroy – creative direction
Maria Enrenreich – director of creative service
Jimmy & Dena Katz – photography

Chart positions

References 

Mack Avenue Records albums
Kenny Garrett albums
2008 albums